Siansivirga jejuensis is a bacterium from the genus of Siansivirga which has been isolated from seawater from the Jeju Island.

References

Flavobacteria
Bacteria described in 2015